was the last Japanese benshi of the silent film era.  Shunsui Matsuda's love for silent films was so great he dedicated his life to finding and preserving valuable classic films from the golden era.

Biography 
Born in 1925 in Tokyo, Shunsui Matsuda performed as child benshi. It was only after the Pacific War, when the post-war shortages created a demand in films that Matsuda really began his vocation as a Benshi.

In 1947 he found himself part of a troupe of itinerant benshi travelling around Kyūshū, whose burgeoning coal mining industry had attracted a lot of workers to the region.  The desperate shortage of any means of entertainment in the area meant that reruns of old silent films were still immensely popular.  It was during his travels that he realized the need to preserve the films from the silent film era.

With the 1923 Kanto earthquake and the War, a vast number of films had already been destroyed, but even worse was the complete laissez-faire attitude of the major studios to their own product.  The few surviving fragments of films such as Ozu's I Graduated, But... (Daigaku wa Detakeredo, 1929) are pretty much entirely down to the efforts of this man, who travelled the country scouring pawn shops and old theatres for films to add to his collection.

In 1948, he officially took up his name as the second Matsuda Shunsui and in the same year he was awarded the top prize in the national Film Narrator's Competition.  In 1952, he founded the Matsuda Film Company and was appointed President of the Friends of Silent Films Association, both which are still being thriving under the guidance of his second son, Yutaka Matsuda. Matsuda Film Company, based on Matsuda private collection, contains over 1,000 films on 6,000 reels, the largest collection of Japanese silent films.

He continued to give performances all the way up until his death in 1987, also directing his own silent film, Jigoku no Mushi (Maggots of Hell) in 1979 and producing Bantsuma - Bando Tsumasaburo no Shogai (Bantsuma - The Life and Times of Bando Tsumasaburo) in 1980.  He can also be seen in full flow providing the narration for the silent film fragment in Kaizo Hayashi's homage to this golden age, To Sleep So As To Dream (Yume Miruyoni Nemuritai, 1986).

In 1984, Matsuda received an invitation from the Frankfurt Museum of Cinema and he gave his first Benshi performance in Europe.  A year later, he received the first Tokyo Metropolitan Culture Prize.

Shunsui Matsuda died of cancer on 8 August 1987 leaving behind a great legacy.

Filmography 
 1979, DIRECTOR, Jigoku no Mushi (Maggots of Hell) 
 1980, PRODUCER, Bantsuma - Bando Tsumasaburo no Shogai (Bantsuma - The Life and Times of Bando Tsumasaburo) 
 PRODUCER, 32 works of “Katsuben Talkie Version” (music and narration all written by himself)

Awards 
 1948 Awarded top prize in the national Film Narrator's Competition
 1963 Awarded Million Pearl Prize
 1985 Awarded the first Tokyo Metropolitan Culture Prize

Trivia 
 The story goes that Matsuda discovered one of the projectionists snipping out footage from one of these films because it "dragged the film down", and thereupon decided to dedicate his life to the act of preserving these early cinematic documents.
 One of his students is Midori Sawato, one of the very few existing Benshi today. 
 He appeared in Yume miru yoni nemuritai alongside Midori Sawato.
 The films that Matsuda managed to collect from around the country constitute around 1000 films, the bulk of which are silent films, amounting to about 6000 rolls of film.

See also 
 Silent Film
 Tsumasaburo Bando
 Midori Sawato
 Benshi

References

Further reading 
 Midnight Eye Feature, Forgotten Fragments: An Introduction to Japanese Silent Film.
 The Benshi- Japanese Silent Film Narrators

External links 
 Masterpieces of Japanese silent film, classic anime, and documentaries on DVD
 Matsuda Film
 Midnight Eye

Japanese male film actors
Matsuda|Matsuda, Shunsui
1925 births
1987 deaths
Deaths from cancer in Japan
20th-century Japanese male actors